Paul Joseph Kelly (born 1962) is Professor of Political Philosophy at the London School of Economics and Political Science (LSE), and  Head of the Department of Government.

Research

Kelly’s early work and main contribution as a historian of political theory  was as part of a group of revisionist Bentham scholars, having worked on the manuscripts at the Bentham Project at University College London. Kelly rejected the common claim that Bentham was a crude act-utilitarian. Instead, he argued that Bentham developed a complex two-level utilitarian theory similar to those of contemporary indirect utilitarian theorists such as R. M. Hare or John Gray. His further claim that this makes Bentham a central figure in the canon of liberal political philosophers contradicts most standard interpretations, and is still a widely contested interpretation.

Having based his early work on both archival work and philosophical reconstruction, Kelly has gone on to engage in debates about the methodology and importance of history in the study of political thought. His work on the book Political Thinkers, edited with David Boucher, has defended a non-contextualist approach to past political thinkers in contrast to the linguistic contextualism defended by Quentin Skinner amongst others.

His scepticism about reducing political theory to history has also led to a similar scepticism about the claims made for identity in normative political theory. His criticism of multicultural theories and communitarianism, has led to a defence of liberal egalitarianism that draws on the work of British political theorists such as Brian Barry and H. L. A. Hart, as much as that of John Rawls. Kelly’s work on liberal egalitarianism has concentrated on its claims as a political theory and his most recent work is on the defence of liberal moralism against the arguments of ‘realist’ political theorists such as Bernard Williams.

Recent publications

 Political thinkers: from Socrates to the present , Oxford University Press, 2009, Oxford, UK.
 Liberalism, secularism and the challenge of religion - is there a crisis? , Oneworld, London, 2008, UK, pp. 124–131.
  Locke’s second treatise of government: a reader’s guide. , Continuum, London, 2007 UK.
 Equality, marginalisation and freedom of expression. , In: Newey, Glen, (ed.) Freedom of speech. Cambridge Scholars Publishing, Newcastle, 2007, UK, pp. 74–96.
 Liberalism and epistemic diversity: Mill's sceptical legacy. Episteme, 3 (3). pp. 248–265 2006. (ISSN 1742-3600)
 The social theory of anti-liberalism. Critical review of international social and political philosophy, 9 (2). pp. 137–154, 2006. (ISSN 1369-8230)
 Political theory: the state of the art. Politics, 26 (1). pp. 47–53, 2006. ISSN 0263-3957

References

External links
Paul Kelly - LSE Experts entry

1962 births
Living people
Academics of the London School of Economics